Piwi-like protein 1 is a protein that in humans is encoded by the PIWIL1 gene.

This gene encodes a member of the PIWI subfamily of Argonaute proteins, evolutionarily conserved proteins containing both PAZ and Piwi motifs that play important roles in stem cell self-renewal, RNA silencing, and translational regulation in diverse organisms. 

The encoded protein may play a role as an intrinsic regulator of the self-renewal capacity of germline and hematopoietic stem cells.

References

Further reading